The USC Trojans baseball program represents the University of Southern California in college baseball. Established in 1888, the team is a member of the National Collegiate Athletic Association and the Pac-12 Conference.  USC’s home field is Dedeaux Field, which is named in honor of former head coach and National College Baseball Hall of Fame inductee Rod Dedeaux.

The USC Trojans are one of the most successful programs in the history of college baseball. The Trojans have won more baseball national championships than any other program across all divisions of college baseball. With 12 national championships, USC is far and away the leader in that category; no other Division I school has more than six. As of June 14, 2021, USC also ranked fifth in all-time College World Series (CWS) appearances with 21, trailing only Texas (37), Miami (FL) (25), Florida State (23), and Arizona State (22). The Trojans have won more individual CWS games (74) than any program but Texas (85). USC also ranks fourth in all-time NCAA Tournament wins with 173—trailing only Texas (245), Florida State (199), and Miami (194)—and 10th in total NCAA Tournament appearances with 37.

The Trojans have compiled an all-time record of 2,944–1,745–29—ranking sixth in all-time wins and 22nd in all-time win percentage—and have captured outright or tied for 38 conference championships, as of the end of the 2021 season.  USC's most notable baseball coach was Rod Dedeaux, who coached from 1942 to 1986 and led the school to 11 of its NCAA championships, including five straight from 1970 to 1974.  The first Trojan national championship came in 1948.  The 12th and most recent NCAA championship came in 1998.

History

The early years

The Trojans began recognizing baseball as a school sport in 1889.  As with many programs during the late 19th century and early 20th century, the Trojans lacked a consistent head coach, when they even had one at all.  It was not until 1908 that the Trojans had an official head coach, Harvey Holmes, but Holmes only coached the team for one year.  Holmes also coached other sports at USC including football and track.  The team would get another coach during the 1911 season, Curtiss Bernard.  Bernard also only coached for a year, and in 1912 the Trojans once again had a one-year coach in Len Burrell.

During the World War I years, the USC baseball team was made up mostly of law school students, but the team opened up to all students for the 1916 and 1917 seasons.  Following the conclusion of the war, the baseball team was coached by "Gloomy Gus" Henderson in 1920 (who would also coach the Trojan basketball team for two years and the football team for six).  Henderson would join forces with Willis Hunter as co-coaches for the 1921 season, but the team was left without a coach for the 1922 season.  In 1923 the team was coached by George Wheeler, who also coached the law students during the 1914 season.  Wheeler coached the team for a year, and would mark the last time the Trojan baseball team has lacked consistency at the coaching position.

Sam Crawford era

Long-time Major League Baseball player and multiple MLB record-holder Sam Crawford took over as head coach of USC baseball in 1924.  Crawford would mark the end of inconsistency at the coaching ranks for the baseball program.  During his tenure, the program slowly began to rise to national prominence, and Crawford helped to create the California Intercollegiate Baseball Association (CIBA) in 1927.  Crawford coached the Trojans for six years before turning the reigns over to Sam Barry.  Crawford compiled an overall record of 59-46-3, including a second-place finish during the initial campaign for the CIBA.

Sam Barry era
In 1930, Sam Barry took over the USC baseball program and immediately built off of the success his predecessor had.  On his arrival at USC in 1929, he was named head basketball coach and was made an assistant for the USC football team under his friend and colleague, Howard Jones.  When Jones died suddenly in 1941, Barry was named his successor, and served as head coach for all three major USC sports teams simultaneously.  Barry won the CIBA title in his first year, finishing 11–2 and 25–5–1 overall.  During the next decade, Barry would claim four more CIBA titles.  Barry coached the Trojans from 1930–1941 before joining the Navy during World War II.  As he left, he recommended that Jeff Cravath become the head football coach, Julie Bescos become the head basketball coach, and Rod Dedeaux, the captain of his 1935 team, become the head baseball coach.  Upon his return, Barry would resume coaching the Trojans alongside Dedeaux.  Barry finished with a career mark of 219–89–3.  He remains one of only three coaches to coach a Final Four game and in a College World Series. Barry was elected to the inaugural class of the American Baseball Coaches Association Hall of Fame in 1966.

Barry-Dedeaux years

When Sam Barry returned from World War II in 1946, Barry and Dedeaux served as co-coaches, with Dedeaux running the team each year until Barry finished the basketball season. The arrangement was so successful that USC won the College World Series in 1948.

1948 National Championship

After finishing the season 40–12–1, USC met Yale for the 1948 NCAA Division I baseball championship at the second College World Series.  The CWS in 1948 was a best 2-out-of-3 format.  The games were played on June 25 and June 26, with June 26 being a doubleheader if necessary.  USC won the first game, 3–1 to take a 1–0 series lead, but lost game 2 by a score of 8–3.  The third and final game immediately followed game 2.  USC scored a run in the first inning to claim a lead it would not surrender.  USC claimed their first national championship with a game 3 victory, 9–2.  Although USC won, they were unable to prevent future President of the United States of America, George Bush, from collecting a double in the final game.

Rod Dedeaux era
After being co-head coach in 1942 with his former college coach Sam Barry, Dedeaux took over the USC program in 1943.  Barry recommended Dedeaux to coach the team when Sam Barry joined the Navy.  Dedeaux coached the Trojans by himself for the next three years, until once again joining forces with Barry as co-head coaches.  After Barry's death in September 1950, Dedeaux became the sole coach of USC baseball.

After taking over in 1951, Dedeaux became the sole coach and proceeded to build on the early success to establish the strongest program in collegiate baseball.  The Trojans claimed 11 straight CIBA championships in Dedeaux's first 11 years.  The Trojans claimed nine outright titles and tied for first in 1953 and 1957.  Following the 1957 campaign, Dedeaux's team finished the season 36–8 overall and earned the first of his 10 national championships as sole coach.

1958 National Championship

1961 National Championship

1963 National Championship

1968 National Championship

1970 National Championship

1971 National Championship

1972 National Championship

1973 National Championship

1974 National Championship

1978 National Championship

Retirement and legacy
After a total of 45 years as head coach of USC, Dedeaux decided to retire following the 1986 campaign.  Dedeaux drastically changed college baseball and left historic marks on the sport that might never be touched.  Dedeaux won a total of 11 national championships, 10 by himself and one with Sam Barry, compiled a record of 1,332–571–11, and completed a stretch of 37 years without a losing season.  He retired as the winningest coach in college baseball history and held that distinction until 1994 when Texas head coach Cliff Gustafson broke it.

While he was at USC, Dedeaux also served as coach of the United States national baseball team at both the 1964 Summer Olympics in Tokyo, Japan, and the 1984 Summer Olympics in Los Angeles, with baseball being a demonstration sport prior to its elevation to full medal status in 1988.

Following his retirement, Dedeaux became the Director of Baseball for USC, and for the rest of his life remained a beloved annual presence at the College World Series in Omaha, Nebraska.  The field the Trojans currently play their games at is named after him.  He was inducted into the American Baseball Coaches Association's Hall of Fame in 1970, and in 1999 was named the Coach of the Century by Collegiate Baseball magazine.

Dedeaux died at age 91 in Glendale, California, of complications from a December 2, 2005, stroke. He was survived by his wife of 66 years, the former Helen Jones, and their four children. On July 4, 2006, Dedeaux was inducted as a member of the first class of inductees into the College Baseball Hall of Fame.

Post Rod Dedeaux

Mike Gillespie

USC reached out to Mike Gillespie, one of Rod Dedeaux's former players, to replace the recently retired coach.  Gillespie played under Dedeaux from 1960–1962, and after a successful coaching stint at the College of the Canyons, he was named just the fourth head coach of USC baseball since 1924.

1998 National Championship

Gillespie was named National Coach of the Year in 1998.

Retirement and legacy
After 20 years as the head coach of the Trojans, Gillespie decided to retire following the 2006 season.  During his career, Gillespie kept Trojan baseball in the spotlight, especially in the years leading up to and following the 1998 championship.  He finished with an overall record of 763–471–2 during his tenure as coach of the Trojans.  As a result of his success, Gillespie earned the honor to coach the 2000 USA National Team.  During his tenure he was named Pac-10 coach of the year four times, while his teams produced 44 All-America selections, 94 draft picks, and 25 Major League players.

After sitting out the 2007 season, Gillespie was named coach of the UC Irvine Anteaters in September 2007.  Gillespie replaced Dave Serrano, who had just guided the Anteaters to their first CWS appearance but left to take over at Cal State Fullerton, his alma mater, after George Horton left Fullerton to head the new program at Oregon.

Chad Kreuter
In June 2006, Chad Kreuter became only the fifth man to earn the title of head baseball coach at USC since 1924.  Kreuter replaced his father-in-law, Mike Gillespie, after Gillespie retired.

Kreuter failed to reach the postseason in each of his four years as head coach.  He produced an overall record of 111–117 during this time, never posting a winning record.  During his tenure, the Trojans twice finished in last place in the Pac-10, and never higher than fifth in the conference.  Although his players flourished in the classroom, he came under heavy criticism late in his tenure.  He was relieved of his duties in August 2010 and replaced by assistant coach and former Loyola Marymount head coach Frank Cruz.

2010s
On May 30, 2019, Dan Hubbs was informed that his contract would not be renewed by the university.
On June 14, 2019, former Loyola Marymount head coach Jason Gill was hired to be the head coach for the Trojans.

Jason Gill
On June 14, 2019, Former Loyola Marymount head coach Jason Gill was hired to be the new head coach of the USC Trojans baseball program.

Ball Parks

Bovard Field
Bovard Field was the former home of USC baseball until Dedeaux Field opened in 1974.

The baseball field was aligned (home to center field) similar to Dedeaux Field, but a few degrees clockwise, nearly true north, but just slightly west. Home plate was located in today's E.F. Hutton Park and left field was bounded by Watt Way. Beyond first base, a large eucalyptus tree came into play; while its trunk was in foul territory, some of its branches crossed into fair territory and guarded the foul line in shallow right field.

Dedeaux Field

Dedeaux Field is the home field for the USC Trojans baseball team.  It is named after the former legendary USC coach Rod Dedeaux, who coached from 1942 to 1986.  The Trojans moved into the ballpark in 1974, the same year that they won their fifth consecutive national championship.  After many renovations, the current capacity is 2,500 people.

Head coaches

Records are through March 11, 2020

Year-by-Year Results

Through the end of the 2021 season.
Final Rankings are from Collegiate Baseball Division I Final Polls (1959–2006)

National Championships

USC in the NCAA tournament
The NCAA Division I baseball tournament started in 1947.
The format of the tournament has changed through the years.

NCAA records

Individual records

Team records

Player awards

All-Americans 
The following is a listing of first team selections. Other selections are available at USC's official website.

1948
Wally Hood (p) - ABCA
Art Mazmanian (2b) - ABCA
Hank Workman (of) - ABCA
1949
Jim Brideweser (p) - ABCA
1950
Jay Roundy (of) - ABCA
1952
Hal Charnofsky (ss) - ABCA
1953
Ed Simpson (1b) - ABCA
1956
Kent Hadley (1b) - ABCA
1957
Bill Olson (cf) - ABCA
1958
Jerry Siegert (of) - ABCA
1959
Bill Thom (p) - ABCA
Johnny Werhas (3b) - ABCA
1960
Bruce Gardner (p) - ABCA
1961
Willie Ryan (1b) - ABCA
1964
Walt Peterson (p) - ABCA
1970
Brent Strom (p) - ABCA
1971
Steve Busby (p) - ABCA
1972
Fred Lynn (of) - ABCA
1973
Roy Smalley (ss) - ABCA
1974
Rich Dauer (3b) - ABCA
1975
Steve Kemp - ABCA
1978
Bill Bordley (p) - ABCA
1981
Dan Davidsmeier (ss) - ABCA
1984
Mark McGwire (1b) - ABCA & BA
1988
Jim Campanis (c) - BA
1991
Mark Smith (of) - BA & CB
1995
Gabe Alvarez (ss) - ABCA
Geoff Jenkins (of) - BA & CB
1998
Seth Etherton (p) - ABCA, BA, & CB
Jack Krawczyk (p) - ABCA & CB
1999
Barry Zito (p) - ABCA, BA, & CB
2001
Mark Prior (p) - ABCA, BA, & CB
2005
Jeff Clement (c) - ABCA, BA, & CB
Ian Kennedy (p) - BA & CB

Legend
ABCA = American Baseball Coaches Association
BA = Baseball America
CB = Collegiate Baseball

All-College World Series

1958
Mike Castanon (2b)
Fred Scott (ss)
Ron Fairly (of)
Bill Thom^ (p)
1960
William Ryan (1b)
Bob Levingston (of)
Mickey McNamee (of)
Art Ersepke (of)
Bill Heath (c)
Bruce Gardner (p)
1961
William Ryan (1b)
Art Ersepke (of)
Larry Himes (c)
Jim Withers (p)
Larry Hankammer (p)
1963
Gary Holman (1b)
Kenny Washington (of)
Buddy Hollowell^ (c)
Walt Peterson (p)
1964
Gary Sutherland (ss)
Willy Brown (of)
1966
John Stewart (p)
1968
Bill Seinsoth^* (1b)
Bill Lee (p)
1970
Frank Alfano (2b)
Dan Stoligrosz (3b)
Jim Barr (p)
1971
Frank Alfano (2b)
Fred Lynn* (of)
Mark Sogge (p)
1972
Daryl Arenstein (1b)
Tim Steele (of)
Sam Ceci (c)
Russ McQueen^* (p)
1973
Rod Smalley* (ss)
Ken Huizenga (of)
Randy Scarbery (c)
1974
Rob Adolph (2b)
Rich Dauer (3b)
Marvin Cobb (ss)
Bob Mitchell (of)
George Milke^ (p)
Mark Barr (p)
1978
Dave Hostetler (1b)
Doug Stokke (ss)
Tim Tolman (if)
John Wells (cf)
Rod Boxberger^ (p)
1995
Geoff Jenkins* (of)
Randy Flores (p)
Wes Rachels (if)
1995
Rod Dedeaux~ Head Coach
1998
Robb Gorr (1b)
Jack Krawczyk (p)
Jason Lane (dh)
Eric Munson (c)
Wes Rachels^ (2b)
Brad Ticehurst (of)

Legend
^ denotes player was named MOP of the College World Series
* denotes selection to College World Series All-Decade team
~ denotes selection to All-Time College World Series team

Johnny Bench Award

2005: Jeff Clement
2015: Garrett Stubbs

Notable players
Brian Bannister
Aaron Boone
Bret Boone
Don Buford
Jeff Cirillo
Ron Fairly
Kent Hadley
Geoff Jenkins
Randy Johnson
Jacque Jones
Steve Kemp
Dave Kingman
Barry Latman
Fred Lynn
Mark McGwire
Mark Prior
Tom Seaver
 Al Silvera 
Roy Smalley
Barry Zito

See also
 List of NCAA Division I baseball programs

Notes

References